Prataya Saha is an independent filmmaker, Tedx performer, theatre director and photographer, based out of Bengaluru and Dubai.

Early life 
He was born in Kolkata but he moved to Karnataka after completing his schooling at the Calcutta Boys' School to pursue Electrical and Electronics Engineering at Siddaganga Institute of Technology.

However, his love for photography and storytelling eventually ended up with him pursuing film-making.

Career 
Prataya's directorial debut was Anna's Weekend in 2016, that got selected in festivals in the US and China. From 2017, he started working closely with Bangalore based production house, Red Polka Productions. By 2021 he has made over 10 films, with his films selected in around 70 film festivals around the world, including festivals like the New York Asian Film Festival, Oaxaca Film Fest, Flickers' Rhode Island International Film Festival, Bengaluru International Short Film Festival, etc.

"Just Another Day", his film on gender violence, was awarded a special jury prize on International Day for the Elimination of Violence against Women, by the department of fine arts of Kutahya Dumlupinar University in Turkey, on November 25, 2021.

Other Works 
Prataya forayed into making music videos with Bangalore based production house, Desktop Films in 2020. The music videos have garnered millions of views and are streaming on major music labels like the T-Series.

References

Year of birth missing (living people)
Living people
Indian filmmakers